Walnut Creek may refer to:

Communities
Walnut Creek, Arizona
Walnut Creek, California
Walnut Creek station, a BART station
Walnut Creek, North Carolina
Walnut Creek, Ohio

Streams
Walnut Creek (Arizona), in Coconino County
Walnut Creek (Big Chino Wash), in Yavapai County, Arizona; see Aztec Pass
Walnut Creek (California), in Contra Costa County
Walnut Creek (Southern California)
Walnut Creek (Ocmulgee River tributary), in Georgia
Walnut Creek (Oconee River tributary), in Georgia
Walnut Creek (South River tributary), in Georgia
Walnut Creek (East Nishnabotna River tributary), in Iowa 
Walnut Creek (Raccoon River tributary), in Iowa
Walnut Creek (West Nishnabotna River tributary), a river of Iowa
Walnut Creek (White Rock Creek tributary), in Kansas
Walnut Creek and Dry Walnut Creek, in Great Bend, Kansas
Walnut Creek, a tributary of Waconda Lake in Kansas
Walnut Creek (Marais des Cygnes River tributary), in Kansas and Missouri
Walnut Creek (East Fork Little Chariton River tributary), in Missouri
Walnut Creek (Flat Creek tributary), in Missouri
Walnut Creek (Little Sac River tributary), in Missouri
Walnut Creek (Animas Valley, New Mexico)
Walnut Creek (Playas Valley, New Mexico)
Walnut Creek (Neuse River tributary), in North Carolina
Walnut Creek (Lake Erie), in Pennsylvania
Walnut Creek (Central Texas)
Walnut Creek (Tarrant County), Texas), a tributary of Joe Pool Lake

Other
Walnut Creek Amphitheatre, now Coastal Credit Union Music Park, in Raleigh, North Carolina
Walnut Creek CDROM, a 1990s freeware and shareware provider
Walnut Creek State Park, a former protected area in Oklahoma, permanently closed in 2014
Walnut Creek Middle School, in the Walled Lake Consolidated Schools District, Michigan
Walnut Creek Middle School, in the Millcreek Township School District, Pennsylvania